Euryale, in Greek mythology, was the second eldest of the Gorgons, the three sisters that have the hair of living, venomous snakes.

Family 
Euryale and her sisters were daughters of primordial sea god and goddess Phorcys and Ceto, who personified the dangers of the sea. According to Hyginus, the parents of the Gorgons were Gorgon and Ceto. In some variations of the myth of Orion, she is the hunter's mother by Poseidon, who lay with her following Medusa's death.

Mythology 
Euryale and her sister Stheno were immortal, whereas Medusa was mortal. Euryale, like Stheno and Medusa, also had the ability to turn anyone to stone with her gaze. In many stories, Euryale is noted for her bellowing cries, particularly in the tale of Medusa's death at Perseus' hands, in which her anguished howls could make stone crumble to sand.

See also 
 Cultural depictions of Medusa and Gorgons

Notes

References 

 Gaius Julius Hyginus, Fabulae from The Myths of Hyginus translated and edited by Mary Grant. University of Kansas Publications in Humanistic Studies. Online version at the Topos Text Project.
 Hesiod, Theogony from The Homeric Hymns and Homerica with an English Translation by Hugh G. Evelyn-White, Cambridge, MA.,Harvard University Press; London, William Heinemann Ltd. 1914. Online version at the Perseus Digital Library. Greek text available from the same website.
 Nonnus of Panopolis, Dionysiaca translated by William Henry Denham Rouse (1863-1950), from the Loeb Classical Library, Cambridge, MA, Harvard University Press, 1940.  Online version at the Topos Text Project.
 Nonnus of Panopolis, Dionysiaca. 3 Vols. W.H.D. Rouse. Cambridge, MA., Harvard University Press; London, William Heinemann, Ltd. 1940–1942. Greek text available at the Perseus Digital Library.
 Pindar, Odes translated by Diane Arnson Svarlien. 1990. Online version at the Perseus Digital Library.
 Pindar, The Odes of Pindar including the Principal Fragments with an Introduction and an English Translation by Sir John Sandys, Litt.D., FBA. Cambridge, MA., Harvard University Press; London, William Heinemann Ltd. 1937. Greek text available at the Perseus Digital Library.
 Pseudo-Apollodorus, The Library with an English Translation by Sir James George Frazer, F.B.A., F.R.S. in 2 Volumes, Cambridge, MA, Harvard University Press; London, William Heinemann Ltd. 1921. Online version at the Perseus Digital Library. Greek text available from the same website.

Gorgons
Monsters in Greek mythology
Mythological monsters
Women in Greek mythology